"" (Glory to God) is a Christian hymn in German, with text and music written in 1992 by Kathi Stimmer-Salzeder. It appears in the common Catholic hymnal in German, Gotteslob.

History 
The singer-songwriter  wrote both text and music of "" in 1992, as a paraphrase of the liturgical Gloria. It is contained in the Gotteslob, the common Catholic hymnal in German, as GL 169. It is also part of other hymnals and songbooks.

References

External links 
 

1992 songs
20th-century hymns in German
Contemporary Christian songs